The 2016 St. Petersburg Bowl was a post-season American college football bowl game that was played on December 26, 2016 at Tropicana Field in St. Petersburg, Florida, United States. The ninth edition of the St. Petersburg Bowl featured the Miami Redhawks from the Mid-American Conference against the Mississippi State Bulldogs from the Southeastern Conference.

Team selections 
On December 4, 2016, it was announced that the game would feature the Miami Redhawks against the Mississippi State Bulldogs after both accepted invitations Sunday, marking the first time each team would meet.

Miami (OH) 

After finishing their regular season with a 66 record, the Miami Redhawks appeared in their eleventh bowl game, and the first since the 2011 GoDaddy.com Bowl game against Middle Tennessee. Miami opened the year with a six-game losing streak, and then finished with a six-game winning streak making them the first team to finish a regular season after they lost the first six consecutive games.

Mississippi State 

After finishing their regular season with a 57 record, Mississippi State appeared in their seventh straight bowl game. Mississippi State opened the year with 2 wins and 2 losses, losing to South Alabama and Louisiana State and winning against South Carolina and Massachusetts. Mississippi State then lost 3 consecutive games against Auburn, Brigham Young, and Kentucky before winning 2 games against Samford and Texas A&M. Lastly losing to Alabama and Arkansas before winning against Ole Miss in the Egg Bowl.

Game summary

Scoring summary

Source:

Statistics

Source:

References

External links
Box score at ESPN

2016–17 NCAA football bowl games
2016
2016 St. Petersburg Bowl
2016 St. Petersburg Bowl
21st century in St. Petersburg, Florida
2016 in sports in Florida
December 2016 sports events in the United States